The 1963–64 Balkans Cup was an edition of the Balkans Cup, a football competition for representative clubs from the Balkan states. It was contested by 8 teams and Rapid București won the trophy.

Group A

Notes
Note 1: Beşiktaş originally requested that their two away games in Tirana and Bucharest be played one day apart. But as the dates get closer, they noticed it was almost impossible for the team to play the two games at those dates. They decided to send the substitute players to Tirana together with some youth team players. Their travel took longer than expected and the game was moved from 16 October to 17 October. Team A played in Bucharest and Team B played in Tiranë the same day.

Group B

Finals

First leg

Second leg

Rapid București won 3–1 on aggregate.

References

External links 

 RSSSF Archive → Balkans Cup
 
 Mehmet Çelik. "Balkan Cup". Turkish Soccer

1963
1963–64 in European football
1964–65 in European football
1963–64 in Romanian football
1964–65 in Romanian football
1963–64 in Greek football
1964–65 in Greek football
1963–64 in Bulgarian football
1964–65 in Bulgarian football
1963–64 in Turkish football
1964–65 in Turkish football
1963–64 in Yugoslav football
1964–65 in Yugoslav football
1963–64 in Albanian football
1964–65 in Albanian football